Incheon or Inchon may refer to:

Incheon, a metropolitan city in South Korea
Incheon International Airport, the largest airport in South Korea
Inchon (film), a 1981 film directed by Terence Young
Battle of Inchon, an invasion and battle during the Korean War
, an amphibious assault ship of the US Navy.
Incheon-class frigate, a coastal defense class of frigates of the Republic of Korea Navy

See also
Revised Romanization of Korean, for explanation of the two spellings